Aliabad (also Romanized as ‘Alīābād) is a village in Kharaqan-e Sharqi Rural District, Abgarm District, Avaj County, Qazvin Province, Iran. At the 2006 census, its population was 37, in 8 families.

References 

Populated places in Avaj County